Ernst August, Hereditary Prince of Brunswick, Prince of Hanover (18 March 1914 – 9 December 1987) was head of the House of Hanover from 1953 until his death in 1987. From his birth until the German Revolution of 1918–1919 he was the heir apparent to the Duchy of Brunswick, a state of the German Empire.

He was born at Braunschweig, Germany, the eldest son of Ernest Augustus, Duke of Brunswick and Princess Viktoria Luise of Prussia, the only daughter of Emperor Wilhelm II, Ernest Augustus's third cousin in descent from George III of the United Kingdom. Ernst August's parents were, therefore, third cousins, once removed. From his birth, he was the Hereditary Prince of Brunswick. He was also, shortly after birth in 1914, made a British prince by King George V of the United Kingdom, and was heir to the titles Duke of Cumberland and Teviotdale and Earl of Armagh which were suspended under the Titles Deprivation Act 1917.

Life

The christening of Ernst August in the summer of 1914 was the last great gathering of European monarchs before the start of World War I. He had an illustrious list of godparents: George V of the United Kingdom, Franz Joseph I of Austria, Nicholas II of Russia, Ludwig III of Bavaria, Frederick Francis IV, Grand Duke of Mecklenburg-Schwerin, Prince Adalbert of Prussia, Prince Oskar of Prussia, Prince Maximilian of Baden, the 1st Royal Bavarian Heavy Cavalry Regiment, and all four of his grandparents: the German Emperor and Empress and the Duke and Duchess of Cumberland.

He ceased being heir to the duchy of Brunswick at the age of four, when his father abdicated in 1918. After his father's death in 1953, he became head of the House of Hanover.

During World War II, he fought at the Russian Front as Oberleutnant in the staff of Generaloberst Erich Hoepner. He was seriously injured near Charkov in spring 1943. After the 20 July plot in 1944, he was imprisoned for a few weeks by the Gestapo in Berlin.

He had joined the SS in 1933 and remained a member for one year. His official "denazification" certificate from 1949 vetting his Third Reich associations classified him as "a nominal Nazi supporter", without being a Nazi party member, and according to a Foreign Office record.

In 1938 his sister, Princess Frederica had married the later King Paul I of the Hellenes and in 1946 his younger brother Prince George William married Princess Sophie of Greece and Denmark, thus becoming the brother-in-law of Prince Philip, Duke of Edinburgh and Queen Elizabeth II of the United Kingdom.

Ernest Augustus was himself an heir to the British titles of Prince of Great Britain and Ireland, recognised ad personam for Ernst August's father as well as for him and his siblings by King George V of the United Kingdom on 17 June 1914, Duke of Cumberland and Teviotdale, Earl of Armagh, which however were all suspended under the Titles Deprivation Act 1917. In addition to being a German, he also held British nationality, after successfully claiming it under the Sophia Naturalization Act 1705 in the case of Attorney-General v. Prince Ernest Augustus of Hanover. Nonetheless, a problem arose as foreign royal titles can't be entered into a British passport. Therefore, the titles Prince of Hanover, Duke of Brunswick and Lüneburg could not be mentioned there, nor could the British titles due to the Titles Deprivation Act of 1917. The name which was finally entered into his British documents, was thus Ernest Augustus Guelph, with the addition of His Royal Highness. Guelph is thus also the British last name of his siblings and children, all styled Royal Highnesses in the United Kingdom.

In 1961 he sold his remaining properties at Herrenhausen Gardens, including the site of Herrenhausen Palace which had been destroyed by a British bombing raid in 1943. He kept however the Princely House, a small palace built in 1720 by George I of Great Britain for his daughter Anna Louise. Ernest Augustus converted Marienburg Castle into a museum in 1954, after having moved to nearby Calenberg Demesne, which caused a row with his mother, who was forced to move out. He also sold the family's exile seat, Cumberland Castle at Gmunden, Austria, to the state of Upper Austria in 1979, but his family foundation based in Liechtenstein kept vast forests, a game park, a hunting lodge, The Queen's Villa and other property at Gmunden. The family property is now managed by his grandson Ernst August.

Marriage and children
During the Second World War, specifically in 1941, his cousin Prince Hubertus of Prussia married the noted society beauty and aristocrat Baroness Maria Anna von Humboldt-Dachroeden (1916–2003). The couple, however, divorced in 1943, after her affair with her husband's cousin, Prince Ernst August of Hanover, resulted in the birth of a son, whose biological father was Prince Ernst August. Ernest Augustus however did not marry Maria Anna because his parents would not have approved, since she was considered of inadequate birth and was also a divorcée, and the marriage would have made his younger brother Prince George William heir to the headship of the House of Hanover. Thus the child, christened Christian Ernst August Hubertus, Freiherr von Humboldt-Dachroeden, was born in 1943 and currently is a bank consultant.

On 5 September 1951, Ernest Augustus married Princess Ortrud of Schleswig-Holstein-Sonderburg-Glücksburg (1925–1980). The wedding was attended by many important royal figures, including his sister Queen Frederica and her husband King Paul of Greece, and the heads of the houses of Saxony, Hesse, Mecklenburg, Oldenburg, and Baden. The wedding was followed with a reception in the Gallery Building at Herrenhausen Gardens, the only part of the House of Hanover's former summer palace still intact, as the palace itself had been burned down during World War II.

His children by his first wife are: 
 Princess Marie of Hanover (born 1952), married Count Michael Georg von Hochberg-Fürstenstein (b. 1943) and had issue.
 Prince Ernst August of Hanover (born 1954), married firstly Chantal Hochuli (b. 1955) and had issue, married secondly Princess Caroline of Monaco and had issue.
 Prince Ludwig Rudolph of Hanover (1955–1988), married Countess Isabelle von Thurn und Valsassina-Como-Vercelli (1962–1988), with whom he had one son. Ludwig committed suicide shortly after discovering the body of his wife, who had died of a drug overdose.
 Princess Olga Sophie Charlotte Anna of Hanover (born 1958)
 Princess Alexandra of Hanover (born 1959), married Andreas, 8th Prince of Leiningen (b. 1955) and had issue.
 Prince Heinrich of Hanover (born 1961), married Thyra Donata Sixtina von Westernhagen and had issue (including a son, Albert).

Princess Ortrud died in 1980.

Ernest Augustus married again in 1981, Countess Monika zu Solms-Laubach (1929–2015), daughter of Georg, 9th Count of Solms-Laubach (1899-1969) and his wife, Princess Johanna of Solms-Hohensolms-Lich (1905-1982).

He died at Schulenburg, Pattensen, Lower Saxony, Germany, aged 73, and was buried next to his first wife on a round bastion of Marienburg Castle (Hanover).

In popular culture
He was portrayed by Daniel Betts in the first season of the Netflix series The Crown.

Ancestry

Patrilineal descent, descent from father to son, is the principle behind membership in royal houses, as it can be traced back through the generations – which means that the historically accurate royal house of monarchs of the House of Hanover was the House of Lucca (or Este, or Welf).

This is the descent of the primary male heir. For the complete expanded family tree, see List of members of the House of Hanover.

Oberto I, 912–975
Oberto II, 940–1017
Albert Azzo I, Margrave of Milan, 970–1029
Albert Azzo II, Margrave of Milan, d. 1097
Welf I, Duke of Bavaria, 1037–1101
Henry IX, Duke of Bavaria, 1074–1126
Henry X, Duke of Bavaria, 1108–1139
Henry the Lion, 1129–1195
William of Winchester, Lord of Lunenburg, 1184–1213
Otto I, Duke of Brunswick-Lüneburg, 1204–1252
Albert I, Duke of Brunswick-Lüneburg, 1236–1279
Albert II, Duke of Brunswick-Lüneburg, 1268–1318
Magnus the Pious, Duke of Brunswick-Lüneburg, 1304–1369
Magnus II, Duke of Brunswick-Lüneburg, 1328–1373
Bernard I, Duke of Brunswick-Lüneburg, 1362–1434
Frederick II, Duke of Brunswick-Lüneburg, 1408–1478
Otto V, Duke of Brunswick-Lüneburg, 1439–1471
Henry I, Duke of Brunswick-Lüneburg, 1468–1532
Ernest I, Duke of Brunswick-Lüneburg, 1497–1546
William, Duke of Brunswick-Lüneburg, 1535–1592
George, Duke of Brunswick-Lüneburg, 1582–1641
Ernest Augustus, Elector of Hanover, 1629–1698
George I of Great Britain, 1660–1727
George II of Great Britain, 1683–1760
Frederick, Prince of Wales, 1707–1751
George III of the United Kingdom, 1738–1820
Ernest Augustus, King of Hanover, 1771–1851
George V of Hanover, 1819–1878
Ernest Augustus, Crown Prince of Hanover, 1845–1923
Ernest Augustus, Duke of Brunswick, 1887–1953
Ernest Augustus, Hereditary Prince of Brunswick, 1914–1987

Notes

External links
Official website of the House of Hanover (in German)

1914 births
1987 deaths
Nobility from Braunschweig
Hanoverian princes
Princes of the United Kingdom
House of Hanover
Heirs apparent who never acceded
Sons of monarchs